Alexander Lucas Lind Rasmussen (born 26 June 2002) is a Danish professional footballer, who plays as a forward for Silkeborg IF.

Club career

Silkeborg IF
Lind joined Silkeborg IF in 2016 from Hørning IF. On 6 July 2017 - his 15th birthday - Lind signed a long trainee-contract with Silkeborg until the summer 2020, after an impressive first season with 33 goals for the U15s.

In the autumn of 2019, he joined the training with SIF’s first team after extending his contract until the end of 2022. At this point, Lind had played two reserve league games and one friendly game for the first team. He got his official debut in the last game of 2019, when he on 15 December 2019 replaced Filip Lesniak in the last minutes of a Danish Superliga game against Lyngby Boldklub. Lind became the fourth-youngest debutant in the history of Silkeborg, aged 17 years 171 days old. He scores his first professional goal in on 15 June 2020 against Odense Boldklub.

References

External links
 Alexander Lind  at Silkeborg IF 
 
 

2002 births
Living people
Danish men's footballers
Association football forwards
Denmark youth international footballers
Danish 1st Division players
Danish Superliga players
Silkeborg IF players